Arthur Timms (9 July 1914 – 29 July 1970) was an Australian rules footballer who played for the South Melbourne Football Club in the Victorian Football League (VFL).

Notes

External links 

1914 births
1970 deaths
Australian rules footballers from Victoria (Australia)
Sydney Swans players